Dinandougou is a commune in the Cercle of Koulikoro in the Koulikoro Region of south-western Mali. The principal town lies at Kenekou and it has 28 villages: Banancoro, Bakolé, Bougoukoro, Bouramabougou, Dinan-Marka, Dinan-Bamanan, Diaguinébougou, Diecoungo, Dioni, Doubala, Donéguébougou, Fatiambougou, Gossigo, Goundando, Kakoulé, Kaliabougou, Kamani, Kassa, Mamadibougou, Ourongo, Sassila, Sirimou, Tamato, Tiécourabougou-Est, Tiécorurabougou-Ouest, Tieconungo, Tidiani-Tourébougou, and Tierkéla. As of 2005 the commune had a population of 17841.

References

Communes of Koulikoro Region